Halekulani is a historic oceanfront luxury hotel located on Waikiki Beach in Honolulu, Hawaii, established in 1917. Halekulani is a Hawaiian word meaning "House Befitting Heaven".

It has three restaurants on the property – House Without a Key, Orchids, and La Mer.  It is also the home of SpaHalekulani and the Lewers Lounge.

The hotel is a member of both The Leading Hotels of the World and Imperial Hotel, Ltd., marketing and trade associations geared toward luxury hotels.

Halekulani has received numerous awards, including a World's Best 2005 award from Travel & Leisure magazine.  It received Four Stars from Mobil Travel Guide and a AAA Four Diamonds rating.

The hotel is currently owned and operated by the Japanese company Mitsui Fudosan. Mitsui Fudosan brought luxury hospitality executive Peter Shaindlin to Hawaii as CEO of the Halekulani Corporation, overseeing the hotel. The hotel's boutique sister property, Waikiki Parc, is located across the street.

History
In 1883, businessman Robert Lewers built a two-story house on the site of the modern hotel's main building. In 1907, Lewers leased the property to journalist Edward Irwin, who converted it to a hotel called the Hau Tree. It was purchased in 1917 by Juliet and Clifford Kimball, who established it as Halekulani. The Kimballs enlarged the resort over the years, purchasing a neighboring plot of land and adding additional buildings. After their deaths, their heirs sold the hotel to the Norton Clapp family in 1962 for $4.2 million. In 1978, the Clapps announced their intention to replace the aging collection of structures with a modern luxury hotel. On January 15, 1981 the hotel was purchased by Mitsui Fudosan USA and incorporated as the Halekulani Corporation, a U.S. based company. The current 453-room hotel structure opened in 1984.

The original Halekulani was a plain residential hotel, more an informal grouping of simple bungalows on simple landscaping, offering inexpensive, unpretentious accommodations, with simple food. Later it grew into a more conventional hotel with numerous buildings containing several rooms each and two well known restaurants; one being the House Without a Key made famous by the Earl Derr Biggers novel of the same name. The other was the Coral Tree Lanai, known for its gracious seaside service. The low density on the extensive grounds made it an attractive investment for rebuilding and rebirth.

Notable features

 The swimming pool's bottom is covered in 1.2 million South African glass mosaic tiles that form a distinctive design in the shape of a Cattleya orchid.
 A century-old Kiawe tree in the outside area of House Without a Key
 Mahiole (Feathered helmet), a pair of 1983 stone sculptures by Charles W. Watson

References

External links 
 
 Halekulani history book

Hotels in Honolulu
Waikiki
Mitsui Fudosan
Resorts in Hawaii
1917 establishments in Hawaii
Hotels established in 1917
Hotel buildings completed in 1984